Thomazeau Volcano or Thomazeau cinder cones, is a group of extinct cinder cones outside of Thomazeau, Haiti, it was active from 1.5 million years ago to the Pleistocene.

It was discovered in 1982 by the Haitian Bureau of Mines and Energy, who discovered materials such as Nepheline, pyroclastic flows and basalt rock. Only a very well preserved cone remains where its lava flow is distinctly visible.

See also 

 Morne la Vigie
 List of volcanoes in Haiti

References 

Pleistocene volcanoes
Volcanoes of Haiti